Réjane Magloire (born 1964) is a Congolese–American singer, model, and actress.

Biography

Réjane Magloire was born in 1964 in Likasi, Zaïre (now known as the Democratic Republic of the Congo), but grew up in New York City, United States. She studied Western classical music with heavy emphasis on opera singing. Her father is Haitian and her mother Polish.

As an actress, Magloire had early exposure on television in commercials and went on to play Samantha, a member of the Short Circus, on the TV series The Electric Company from 1975 to the end of production in 1977 (she replaced Melanie Henderson). PBS stations continued airing reruns of The Electric Company through 1985.

In the early 1980s, Magloire provided vocals for New York-based R&B and post-disco group Indeep. After Indeep broke up, she released a few solo singles as Reggie, and in 1989, a self-titled debut album using this name. She later joined the studio-based Belgian project Technotronic and appeared on its 1991 album Body to Body. In 2005, she released the solo album Forbidden Opera (Virgin Classics/EMI Records), a fusion of opera and contemporary R&B.

References

External links
 

Living people
American people of Haitian descent
American people of Polish descent
Democratic Republic of the Congo emigrants to the United States
20th-century Democratic Republic of the Congo women singers
American dance musicians
American child actresses
American mezzo-sopranos
American television actresses
EMI Classics and Virgin Classics artists
1964 births
21st-century American women